Edward Gay Rohrbough (January 4, 1874 – December 12, 1956) was a Republican United States Representative from West Virginia.  He was born in 1874, near Buckhannon, West Virginia, in Upshur County, West Virginia. He served in the Seventy-eighth and Eightieth Congress. He died December 12, 1956.

He attended the public schools and West Virginia Wesleyan College at Buckhannon. He graduated from Allegheny College in  Meadville, Pennsylvania, in 1900 and from Harvard University in 1906. He later studied at the University of Chicago,  instructed at West Virginia Wesleyan College and instructed at West Virginia University at Morgantown, West Virginia. In 1900 and 1901 he taught school in Brookville, Pennsylvania, and at Glenville State Normal School from 1901 to 1907. He served as vice president of Fairmont State Teachers College in 1907 and 1908 and president of Glenville State Teachers College from 1908 to 1942. In 1908, he dually served as Glenville's first head football coach, compiling a 1–1–0 record.

He was elected to Congress in 1942. He was an unsuccessful candidate for re-election in 1944 but was again elected in 1946. His candidacy for re-election in 1948 was not successful. He  died in Washington, D.C., on December 12, 1956, and was buried in Stalnaker Cemetery in Glenville, West Virginia.

Head coaching record

See also
 United States congressional delegations from West Virginia

External links
 
 

1874 births
1956 deaths
Allegheny College alumni
Educators from West Virginia
Glenville State College faculty
Glenville State Pioneers football coaches
Harvard University alumni
People from Buckhannon, West Virginia
People from Glenville, West Virginia
Republican Party members of the United States House of Representatives from West Virginia
University of Chicago alumni
West Virginia University faculty
West Virginia Wesleyan College alumni